Desire is a sense of longing or hoping. It may also refer to:

Places
 Desire Street, New Orleans, Louisiana
 Desire (New Orleans streetcar line), an historic streetcar line
 Desire Area, New Orleans
 Desire Projects

People
 Désiré, a French male given name
 Désiré (baritone), stage name of French comic baritone Amable Courtecuisse (1823–1873)
 Desire (wrestler), American professional wrestler

Arts and entertainment

Films
 Desire (1920 film), a British film directed by George Edwardes-Hall
 Desire (1921 film), a German film directed by F.W. Murnau
 Desire (1923 film), an American film directed by directed by Rowland V. Lee
 Desire (1936 film), an American film starring Marlene Dietrich and Gary Cooper 
 Desire (1946 Italian film), an Italian film directed by Marcello Pagliero and Roberto Rossellini
 Desire (1946 Swedish film), a Swedish film directed by Edvin Adolphson
 Desire (1958 film), a Czech film directed by Vojtěch Jasný
 Desire (1968 film), a South Korean film featuring Kim Ji-mee
 Desire (1974 film), a Hong Kong film starring Tony Liu
 Desire (1982 film), a Filipino-American film directed by Eddie Romero
 Desire (1993 film), an American film starring Kate Hodge
 Desire (2000 film), featuring Martin Donovan
 Desire (2009 film), a film by Welsh director Gareth Jones
 Desire (2017 film) an Argentine film starring Pampita
 Desires (film), a 1952 German film
 Q (2011 film), a French erotic drama starring Déborah Révy released in the USA as Desire
 The Desire (2010 film), a 2010 Indo-Chinese feature film
 The Desire (1944 film) (El deseo), a 1944 Argentine drama film

Music

Groups and labels
 Desire (band), an American/Canadian electronic act
 Desire, a New Zealand 1980s group Gary Havoc

Albums
 Desire (Bob Dylan album), 1976
 Desire (Hurts album), 2017
 Desire (French Affair album), 2001
 Desire (Iyanya album), 2013
 Desire (Pharoahe Monch album), also the title song
 Desire (Tom Scott album), also the title song
 Desire (Toyah album), also the title song
 Desire (Tuxedomoon album), also the title song
Desire, by BZN

Songs
 "Desire" (Andy Gibb song), 1980
 "Desire" (Claudette Pace song)
 "Desire" (Darin song), 2007
 "Desire" (Do As Infinity song), 2001
 "Desire" (Geri Halliwell song), 2005
 "Desire" (Luna Sea song), 1995
 "Desire" (Ought song), 2018
 "Desire" (Ryan Adams song), 2002
 "Desire" (U2 song), 1988
 "Desire" (Years & Years song), 2014
 "Desire", by Akina Nakamori
 "Desire", by En Vogue from Funky Divas
 "Desire", by The Gaslight Anthem from Handwritten
 "Desire", song List of compositions by Modest Mussorgsky
 "Desire", by Holly Valance from State of Mind
 "Desire", by Meg Myers from Make a Shadow
 "Desire", by Ozzy Osbourne from No More Tears
 "Desire", by Slayer from Diabolus in Musica
 "Desire", by Poets of the Fall from Carnival of Rust
 "Desire", by Raheem DeVaughn from Love Behind the Melody
 "Desire", by Roni Griffith
 "Desire", by Suicide Commando from Construct-Destruct
 "Desire", by Talk Talk from Spirit of Eden
 "Desire", by Toad the Wet Sprocket from Coil
 "Desire", by Vassy
 "Desire", by Yanni from Dare to Dream
 "Desire", by Yello from Stella
 "Desires", by Drake from Dark Lane Demo Tapes

Television
 Desire (TV series), an American telenovela
 "Desire", an episode of Grey's Anatomy

Other arts and entertainment
 Desire (DC Comics), a fictional character in The Sandman comic series
 Desire (manga), a yaoi manga written by Maki Kazumi and illustrated by Yukine Honami
Desiré, an Old French Breton lai or rhymed tale

Ships
 Desire (ship), a ship sailed by 16th-century explorers Thomas Cavendish and John Davis
 USS Desire (SP-786), a United States Navy patrol boat in commission from 1917 to 1919

Other uses
 HTC Desire, an Android-based phone by HTC

See also

 Desiree (disambiguation)
 Desirable (disambiguation)
 
 Crave (disambiguation)
 Greed (disambiguation)
 Hunger (disambiguation)